Switzerland was represented by Carol Rich, with the song "Moitié, moitié" at the 1987 Eurovision Song Contest, which took place on 9 May.

Before Eurovision

Concours Eurovision 1987 
Swiss Italian broadcaster RTSI was in charge of broadcasting the selection for the Swiss entry for the 1987 contest. The national final was held at the studios of RTSI in Lugano, hosted by Letizia Brunati. Nine songs were submitted for the 1987 national final and the winning song was chosen by three regional juries, a press jury, and an expert jury.

Other participants included past and future Swiss representatives including Marc Dietrich (1971, 1976, 1979, 1981) and Furbaz (1989).

At Eurovision
On the night of the contest, Rich performed last, following Yugoslavia. At the close of voting, "Moitié, moitié" received 27 points, placing Switzerland 17th of the 22 entries. The Swiss jury awarded its 12 points to Ireland.

Voting

References

External links
 Swiss National Final 1987

1987
Countries in the Eurovision Song Contest 1987
Eurovision